Dreifaltigkeitsberg is a mountain of Baden-Württemberg, Germany.

Mountains and hills of the Swabian Jura